The shaka sign, sometimes known as "hang loose" or "right on", is a gesture with friendly intent often associated with Hawaii and surf culture. It consists of extending the thumb and smallest finger while holding the three middle fingers curled, and gesturing in salutation while presenting the front or back of the hand; the wrist may be rotated back and forth for emphasis. The shaka sign should not be confused with the sign of the horns, where the index and pinky finger is extended and the thumb holds down the middle two fingers.

Origins

According to the Honolulu Star-Bulletin, prevailing local lore credits the gesture to Hamana Kalili of Laie, who lost the three middle fingers of his right hand while working at the Kahuku Sugar Mill. Kalili was then shifted to guarding the sugar train, and his all-clear wave of thumb and pinkie is said to have evolved into the shaka as children imitated the gesture.

Another theory relates the origin of the shaka to the Spanish immigrants, who folded their middle fingers and took their thumbs to their lips as a friendly gesture to represent sharing a drink with the natives they met in Hawaii.

The late Lippy Espinda, a used car salesman and Oahu-based entertainer, has also been named as a possible creator of the shaka. Espinda, who frequently appeared as an extra in Hawaii Five-O as well as The Brady Bunch episodes shot in Hawaii, used the term and the sign during his television ads in the '60s. Though the claim that he is the originator of the shaka sign is debatable, he is credited with increasing its popularity and that of Hawaiian Pidgin as well. The shaka has achieved great popularity in Australia, primarily among teenagers on social media sites such as Instagram and Facebook.

The word shaka is also used as an interjection expressing approval, which may predate its use for the shaka sign. According to The Oxford English Dictionary the origin of the word is uncertain, but it may come from Japanese, where it is a byname for the Buddha.

Meaning and use 

Residents of Hawaii use the shaka to convey the "Aloha Spirit", a concept of friendship, understanding, compassion, and solidarity among the various ethnic cultures that reside in Hawaii, lacking a direct semantic to literal translation. Drivers will often use it on the road to communicate distant greetings along with gratitude.

In California, the shaka sign may be referred to as "hang loose" or "hang ten", both associated with surfer culture.

In coastal Brazil, the shaka sign, known as the "hang loose" (also derived from an eponymous clothing brand, which uses the shaka as a logo), is a common gesture; Ronaldinho usually celebrated the goals he scored by giving the crowd a double shaka. It is also associated with the Brazilian jiu jitsu community internationally.

There are several emoticon representations of the shaka sign, including \,,,/, \m/, and \,,,_. The earliest known use of the first two, with three commas or a lower case "m" corresponding to a hand's three middle fingers, is from 2006. The last, similar to the first except that it represents the thumb extended horizontally (as if perpendicular to the wrist) is reported, together with the first form, from Brigham Young University in 2016.

Similar gestures

Chinese number gestures

The sign has some similarities to the Chinese number gesture for "six".

Beverages
The sign can also be used to indicate the imbibing of a bottled drink, either alcoholic or non-alcoholic, as attested to below, by placing the thumb to the mouth and motioning the little finger upward as if tipping up a bottle's bottom end. A similar meaning can be achieved by pressing the thumb up against the tip of the nose with the little finger raised upwards parallel to the bridge of the nose. It is referred to as "schooies" in Australia (Australian slang for a schooner)

Telecommunications

With the thumb held near the ear and the little finger pointed at the mouth, the gesture is commonly understood to mean "call me", as it resembles the handset of a traditional landline telephone.

The Unicode 9.0 emoji 🤙 "Call me hand" can be interpreted as the shaka sign.

In 2021 it was being reported that the gesture was declining among younger Americans, who favored placing a hand flat against their face, in a manner resembling a smart phone.

Smoking
In Australia and Russia raising the thumb to the mouth while pointing the little finger to the air is seen as an invitation for one to smoke marijuana, the posture resembling the use of a pipe. Similarly in New Zealand, this gesture symbolises smoking a "P" (methamphetamine) pipe, as well as variations of the shaka sign being the recognised gang salute for the Mongrel Mob.

Notable incidents
Since 2015, fans of Brigham Young University (which has a satellite campus in Hawai'i and is also known colloquially as "the Y") have started using the gesture, in deference to newly hired Kalani Sitake, BYU's Polynesian head football coach, and because of its similarity with the letter Y in the American manual alphabet in American Sign Language. It is also used as a nod of respect to Hamana Kalili, a native Hawaiian Latter-day Saint who, according to locals, is the founder of the popular sign.

Texas A&M - Corpus Christi in Corpus Christi, Texas uses the shaka as a gesture for students and faculty there. "Shakas up!" is often spoken when giving the Shaka hand sign.

See also
 ILY sign
 List of gestures
 List of mudras (yoga)
 Manual communication
 Sign of the horns
 Thumb signal

References

External links 
 

Greetings
Hand gestures
Hawaii culture
Surf culture
Symbols of Hawaii